Charles Suonne Davis, Jr. (born March 13, 1983) is a former American football tight end. He was drafted by the Pittsburgh Steelers in the fifth round of the 2006 NFL Draft. He played both college football and college basketball at Purdue.

Davis has also been a member of the New York Giants, Carolina Panthers, Jacksonville Jaguars, New York Sentinels and Hartford Colonials.

Professional career

San Diego Chargers
Davis was signed by the San Diego Chargers on August 1, 2009. He was released on September 5.

New York Sentinels
Davis was drafted by the New York Sentinels on the UFL Premiere Season Draft in 2009. In 2010, Davis played for the Hartford Colonials of the UFL after New York ceased operations. He was re-signed for the 2011 season by Hartford. He became a free agent on August 10, 2011 when the Colonials were contracted.

Return to San Diego
On August 17, 2011, Davis re-signed with the San Diego Chargers.

References

External links
Just Sports Stats
Jacksonville Jaguars bio
Purdue Boilermakers bio
San Diego Chargers bio

1983 births
Living people
Sportspeople from Metro Detroit
Players of American football from Michigan
American football tight ends
Purdue Boilermakers football players
Purdue Boilermakers men's basketball players
Pittsburgh Steelers players
New York Giants players
Carolina Panthers players
Berlin Thunder players
Jacksonville Jaguars players
New York Sentinels players
San Diego Chargers players
Hartford Colonials players
People from Fraser, Michigan
American men's basketball players
St. Mary's Preparatory alumni